The 2016 Shakey's V-League (SVL) season was the thirteenth season of the Shakey's V-League (SVL). There were three indoor conferences for this season.

Open Conference

Preliminary round

Final round 
 Ranking is based from the preliminary round.

Individual awards

Final standings

Collegiate Conference

Preliminary round

Group A

Group B

Quarterfinals round

Final round 
 Ranking is based from the quarter finals round.
 All series are best-of-3

Individual awards

Final standings

Reinforced Conference

Preliminary round

Final round 
 Ranking is based from the preliminary round.
 All series are best-of-3

Individual awards

Final standings

Broadcast Partner 
 ABS-CBN Sports+Action

See also 
 2016 Spikers' Turf

References 

2016 in Philippine sport